Narayana Pillai may refer to:

M. P. Narayana Pillai, Indian writer
Naraina Pillai, Singaporean businessman
Paravur T. K. Narayana Pillai, Indian politician